Lambton County is a county in Southwestern Ontario, Canada. It is bordered on the north by Lake Huron, which is drained by the St. Clair River, the county's western border and part of the Canada-United States border. To the south is Lake Saint Clair and Chatham-Kent. Lambton County's northeastern border follows the Ausable River and Parkhill Creek north until it reaches Lake Huron at the beach community of Grand Bend. The county seat is in the Town of Plympton-Wyoming.

The largest city in Lambton County is Sarnia, which is located at the source of the St. Clair River at Lake Huron. The two Blue Water Bridges cross the river at Sarnia, connecting it to Port Huron, Michigan. The bridges are one of the busiest border crossings between the two countries. The river is also traversed by one passenger ferry further south, and a rail tunnel, also at Sarnia, runs underneath it. The CN rail tunnel accommodates double stacked rail cars. Along with Sarnia, the population centres in Lambton County are: Corunna, Petrolia, Grand Bend, Wyoming, Forest, and Watford.

Lambton County started as a part of the District of Hesse. The district of Hesse included British territories west of Long Point (practically all of western Ontario). The district was later divided and renamed using English district names (Essex, Suffolk, Kent, etc.). Lambton was part of Kent county. In 1849 districts were abolished and the County of Lambton was formed. Lambton and Kent first shared the capital city of Sandwich (since renamed as Windsor, Ontario).  In 1852 the partnership was dissolved and Lambton become a full county. It is named in honour of John Lambton, 1st Earl of Durham, who visited the area in the late 1830s.

Subdivisions
Lambton County consists of 11 municipalities (in order of population):
 City of Sarnia
 Township of St. Clair
 Municipality of Lambton Shores
 Town of Plympton–Wyoming
 Town of Petrolia
 Township of Warwick
 Township of Enniskillen
 Township of Brooke-Alvinston
 Village of Point Edward
 Township of Dawn-Euphemia
 Village of Oil Springs

Independent First Nation reserves
Independent of the County, but located within the Lambton census division, are three First Nations reserves: 
Chippewas of Kettle and Stony Point First Nation, in the Kettle Point area
Aamjiwnaang First Nation, located near many of the refineries in Sarnia's Chemical Valley
Walpole Island, near Wallaceburg

Demographics

Historic population:
 2016: 123,399 (5-year growth rate: -1.0%)
 2011: 124,623 (5-year growth rate: 0.0%)
 2006: 124,600 (5-year growth rate: 0.8%)
 2001: 123,611 (5-year growth rate: -2.5%)
 1996: 126,829

Economy

Total employment for Lambton County is 66,370. Of those, 9,760 (14.7%) are employed in manufacturing; 7,545 (11.4%) in retail trade; 5,080 (7.7%) in accommodation and food services; and 3,155 (4.8%) are employed in agriculture.

Petrochemical and refining is the largest manufacturing sector in Lambton County's economy. Established during World War II, Sarnia and the area along the St. Clair River is home to a major processing centre for oil from Alberta.

In late 2010 and early 2011 a number of companies announced plans to provide ethane from the Marcellus Shale in the United States to Lambton County industries, providing a potential new feedstock for the production of ethylene in Lambton County.

Lambton County is the site of North America's first drilled commercial oil well at Oil Springs in 1858.

Tourism is another important industry in Lambton County, especially along the lake and river. The community of Grand Bend and the Pinery Provincial Park are especially popular tourist destinations, attracting thousands of people each week throughout the summer to their long, uninterrupted beaches. The part of Lambton County along Lake Huron known as Lambton Shores depends almost entirely upon the seasonal industries of tourism and agriculture for its well-being. There are also popular conservation areas along the St. Clair River, and a conservation area named Rock Glen Falls near Arkona along the Ausauble River internationally known for its Devonian period fossils.

Lambton County has 2,346 farms with a total of 592,793 acres. The largest single use of farmland in Lambton is crop production, with 85% of total farmland reported as land in crops. Over the last 20 years, soybeans, wheat, and grain corn have accounted for over 80% of total area crop production in Lambton. The fourth and fifth leading crops are sugar beets and hay. Oats, barley and mixed grains are also produced. Top animal production includes dairy, beef, hog, and poultry.

Infrastructure

Highways

Emergency services
The County of Lambton Emergency Medical Services (EMS) provides land ambulance services to the residents of Lambton County. The County of Lambton EMS has stations in Brigden, Corunna, Forest, Grand Bend, Petrolia, Thedford, Watford, and two stations in Sarnia.  Lambton EMS has ten ambulances and employs approximately 150 full- and part-time Primary Care Paramedics.

Policing is provided by the Ontario Provincial Police (OPP), which has detachments in Grand Bend, Petrolia, Corunna, and Point Edward. The area of Kettle & Stony Point which is one of three native reservations in Lambton County, is policed by the Anishinabek Police Service (APS) but dispatched by the OPP. Walpole Island, another first nations reservation has its own police service, the Walpole Island Police Service. The remaining first nations reservation, Aamjiwnaang First Nation, which falls geographically within the City of Sarnia, is covered by the Sarnia Police Service.

Communities

Alvinston
Arkona
Brigden
Brights Grove
Corunna
Courtright
Forest
Grand Bend
Osborne
Petrolia
Port Franks
Port Lambton
Sarnia
Sombra
Thedford
Walpole Island
Watford
Wyoming

See also
 List of municipalities in Ontario
 List of Ontario Census Divisions
 List of townships in Ontario
 List of secondary schools in Ontario#Lambton County

References

External links

 
Counties in Ontario
Southwestern Ontario
St. Clair River
1849 establishments in Ontario